Moon Jeong-Joo (born 22 March 1990) is a South Korean footballer who plays as midfielder for Chungju Hummel in K League Challenge.

Career
He was selected by Chungju Hummel in the 2013 K League draft. He made his debut goal in his debut match against Police FC on 17 March 2013.

References

External links 

1990 births
Living people
Association football midfielders
South Korean footballers
Chungju Hummel FC players
K League 2 players